Ranga Khush is a Hindi action drama movie of Bollywood directed and produced by Joginder. This film was released in January, 1975 in the banner of Apollo International.

Plot
Ranga, the bandit chief terrorises many villages and the police cannot catch him. A poor villager Sultan Singh lives with his son Karma and daughter Devi. Ranga kills Sultan and kidnaps Devi. Karma tries to organise the villagers against Ranga and his gang of dacoit to save his sister.

Cast
 Bharat Bhushan as Dilip Singh
 Dheeraj Kumar as Karma
 Aruna Irani as Kasturi
 Nazima as Devi
 Nazneen as Reshma
 Joginder as Ranga
 Chandrashekhar as Police Inspector
 Vikram as Karma
 Rajan Haksar
 Som Dutta as Ratna
 Chandrima Bhadury as Ginnibai

Soundtrack
The music direction of Ranga Khush was made by Sonik Omi and main playback singer was Asha Bhosle.

References

External links
 

1975 films
1970s Hindi-language films
Indian action films
Indian rape and revenge films
Films about outlaws
Indian films about revenge
1975 action films
Hindi-language action films